Norman R. Stone Jr. (born September 8, 1935) is an American politician and the longest-serving senator in the Maryland State Senate and the only Senator to have voted against repealing the bans on interracial marriage and same-sex marriage. Stone served in the Maryland House of Delegates from 1963 to 1967.  He was first elected to the State Senate in 1966. Stone has been a member of the Maryland General Assembly for more than 50 years. Stone is a graduate of the Baltimore City College High School and the University of Baltimore Law School.

Career

Legislative Notes
February 9, 1967 - voted against repealing law banning interracial marriage in Maryland.
February 23, 2012 - voted against the "Civil Marriage Protection Act", which would allow same-sex couples to obtain a marriage license in Maryland.

Task Force, Boards and Commissions
In June 2012, Stone was appointed by Maryland legislative leaders to a task force to study the impact of a Maryland Court of Appeals ruling regarding the liability of owners of pit bulls and landlords that rent to them.

References

1935 births
Democratic Party Maryland state senators
Democratic Party members of the Maryland House of Delegates
University of Baltimore alumni
Baltimore City College alumni
Living people
21st-century American politicians